Kumarganj is a university town in the Faizabad district (officially Ayodhya district) in the state of Uttar Pradesh in India. Kumarganj is 37 km south of district headquarters Ayodhya city.

Government and politics

Civic administration
There is a police station in Kumarganj.

Transport
Road
Kumarganj has good connectivity by road to Raebareli, Faizabad, Ayodhya, Lucknow, Kanpur, Varanasi and Allahabad city.

Railways
The nearest railway station is Nihalgarh Railway Station (25 km), Faizabad junction (41 km) and Ayodhya junction (47 km).

Air
The nearest airport is Ayodhya Airport 40 km north, Lucknow Airport 128 km, Varanasi Airport 200 km.

Education
 Acharya Narendra Deva University of Agriculture and Technology

References

 Cities and towns in Faizabad district